MaYoMo was a user-generated news site for mobile citizen journalism. MaYoMo.com, short for "Map Your Moments", was officially launched in October 2009. The site was owned by MaYoMo B.V., which is based in Amsterdam, the Netherlands.

Features

Global news and local stories by the site's community of contributors was geolocated on an interactive world map, depending on the place they have happened. With an "Ask for News" option users could request news and information about particular events from any place of the world . The news content was ordered at a timeline, according to its date of action. One could set the time indicator to any year and date between the year 1895 and 2100 for a narrower search criteria. Users could comment and also rank on a scale from 1 to 5 on each news submission.

MaYoMo hosted user-generated video news about virtual worlds like Lineage II, Half-Life, World of Warcraft, FIFA, Second Life, etc., on "Virtu", a so-called virtual continent, placed between North America and Africa.

In February 2010, MaYoMo had 60,000 videos from 130 countries. The site was available in 11 languages: Arabic, English, French, German, Greek, Italian, Japanese, Simplified Mandarin, Traditional Mandarin, Russian, Spanish.

See also

 Citizen journalism
 Video journalism
 Collaborative journalism
 Mobile news
 User-generated content
 List of video hosting services

References

External links 
 

Citizen journalism
Visual journalism
Dutch news websites
Defunct video on demand services
Former video hosting services